Lake Semyonovskoye is a freshwater lake on the Kola Peninsula, Murmansk Oblast, Russia in Murmansk. It has an area of 0.195 km². Semyonovsky Stream flows from the lake.

Semyonovskoye